Alec B. Francis (born Alec Francis Budd, 2 December 1867 – 6 July 1934) was an English actor, largely of the silent era. He appeared in more than 240 films between 1911 and 1934.

Biography
Francis was born in Suffolk, England. He studied law at Uppingham College in England and practiced with a legal firm in London.

Disliking legal work, Francis joined a stock theater company for which he played bit parts, and was baggage master and property man. He eventually came under contract with a touring company headed by Mr. and Mrs. W. H. Kendall, acting in leading roles in England, India, South Africa, and the United States. He also performed in vaudeville.

Francis served twice in the military, once for Britain and once for the United States. He was in India for a four-year tour of duty with the British Royal Horse Artillery, and He was a nurse with American forces during the Spanish-American War.

Although Francis tried farming after his service as a nurse, he returned to acting and appeared in some plays, including musical productions in which he sang as a baritone. He began acting in films in 1913 and worked for Vitagraph, World, and other film studios.

Francis died in Hollywood Hospital in Hollywood, California, on 6 July 1934, three days after emergency abdominal surgery. His funeral was held at St. Athanasius Episcopal Church in Los Angeles, and his remains cremated.

Selected filmography

 Waiting at the Church (1906, Short) – Con Artist Suitor (uncredited)
 The Military Air-Scout (1911, Short) – Commander Arthur – Marie's Father
 A Reformed Santa Claus (1911, Short)
 Saved from the Titanic (1912, Short) – Father
 Robin Hood (1912, Short) – Sheriff of Nottingham
 The Man of the Hour (1914) – George Garrison
 When Broadway Was a Trail (1914) – Standish Hope
 The Wishing Ring: An Idyll of Old England (1914) – The Earl of Bateson
 Lola (1914) – Dr. Barnhelun
 The Pit (1914) – Cressler
 Alias Jimmy Valentine (1915) – Bill Avery
 The Arrival of Perpetua (1915) – Hastings Curzon
 The Model (1915) – Hugh Seymour
 After Dark (1915) – Capt. Frank Dalton, Old Tom
 The Impostor (1915) – Noel Ferrers
 The Ballet Girl (1916) – Jerry Vergoe
 Fruits of Desire (1916) – Jeremiah Quimby
 The Yellow Passport (1916) – Myron Abram
 The Pawn of Fate (1916) – Abbé Paul
 Human Driftwood (1916) – Father Harrigan
 Tangled Fates (1916) – Mr. Rogers
 The Perils of Divorce (1916) – Craig
 Miss Petticoats (1916) – Worth Courtleigh
 A Woman's Way (1916) – General John Stanton
 Husband and Wife (1916) – James Watson
 The Gilded Cage (1916) – King Comus
 The Heart of a Hero (1916) – Col. Knowlton
 All Man (1916) – John Maynard
 A Hungry Heart (1917)
 The Cinderella Man (1917)
 The Family Honor (1917)
 The Page Mystery (1917)
 Forget Me Not (1917)
 The Auction Block (1917)
 The Venus Model (1918)
 The Marionettes (1918)
 The Glorious Adventure (1918)
 Thirty a Week (1918)
 The Face in the Dark (1918)
 Day Dreams (1919)
 Her Code of Honor (1919)
 Spotlight Sadie (1919)
 The Probation Wife (1919)
 Lord and Lady Algy (1919)
 When Doctors Disagree (1919)
 The World and Its Woman (1919)
 The City of Comrades (1919)
 Heartsease (1919)
 Flame of the Desert (1919)
 The Pest (1919)
 The Butterfly Man (1920)
 The Paliser Case (1920)
 Earthbound (1920)
 Godless Men (1920)
 The Great Moment (1921)
 A Voice in the Dark (1921)
 Courage (1921)
 North of the Rio Grande (1922)
 Beyond the Rocks (1922)
 The Forgotten Law (1922)
 Is Divorce a Failure? (1923)
 The Spider and the Rose (1923)
 The Drivin' Fool (1923)
 The Last Hour (1923)
 A Gentleman of Leisure (1923)
 Mary of the Movies (1923) – cameo
 Three Wise Fools (1923)
 The Gold Diggers (1923)
 The Eternal Three (1923)
 Beau Brummel (1924)
 Listen Lester (1924)
 The Tenth Woman (1924)
 A Fool's Awakening (1924)
 Do It Now (1924)
 Capital Punishment (1925)
 A Thief in Paradise (1925)
 Waking Up the Town (1925)
 Soiled (1925)
 Champion of Lost Causes (1925)
 The Mad Whirl (1925)
 Charley's Aunt (1925)
 Man and Maid (1925)
 The Coast of Folly (1925)
 Where the Worst Begins (1925)
 The Circle (1925)
 Thank You (1925)
 Rose of the World (1925)
 Wandering Footsteps (1925)
 Outwitted (1925)
 The Reckless Sex (1925)
 Tramp, Tramp, Tramp (1926)
 Forever After (1926)
 Pals First (1926)
 The Yankee Señor (1926)
 3 Bad Men (1926)
 Transcontinental Limited (1926)
 The Return of Peter Grimm (1926)
 Camille (1926)
 The Tender Hour (1927)
 Sally in Our Alley (1927)
 The Little Snob (1928)
 The Lion and the Mouse (1928)
 Life's Mockery (1928)
 The Terror (1928)
 The Shepherd of the Hills (1928)
 Evangeline (1929)
 Evidence (1929)
 The Sacred Flame (1929)
 The Mississippi Gambler (1929)
 The Bishop Murder Case (1930)
 The Case of Sergeant Grischa (1930)
 Murder Will Out (1930)
 Outward Bound (1930)
 Feet First (1930)
 Captain Applejack (1931)
 Stout Hearts and Willing Hands (1931)
 Mata Hari (1931) as Major Caron
 Arrowsmith (1931)
 The Last Mile (1932)
 Alias Mary Smith (1932)
 The Last Man (1932)
 Oliver Twist (1933)
 Looking Forward (1933)
 His Private Secretary (1933)
 Alice in Wonderland (1933)
 The Mystery of Mr. X (1934)

References

External links

1867 births
1934 deaths
20th-century English male actors
English male film actors
English male silent film actors
Male actors from London
British expatriate male actors in the United States
People from Paddington